Walder is a surname and given name. Notable people with the name include:

Surname:
Albert Walder (born 1957), Italian cross country skier who competed from 1985 to 1988
Andrew G. Walder (born 1953), American political sociologist
Chaim Walder (1968–2021), Haredi Israeli children's writer who committed suicide after dozens of sexual assault allegations
Chris Walder (1900–1997), Dutch footballer
Christian Walder (born 1991), Austrian World Cup alpine ski racer
Dave Walder (born 1978), rugby union footballer who plays at fly-half for Wasps
David Walder (1928–1978), British Conservative Party politician
Erick Walder (born 1971), American long jumper
Fernand Walder (born 1946), Belgian volleyball player
Francis Walder (1906–1997), Belgian writer and soldier
George Walder, American football player and coach
Harald Walder (born 1973), Austrian former snowboarder
Ingemar Walder (born 1978), Austrian snowboarder
Jay Walder, the chairman and chief executive officer of the Metropolitan Transportation Authority (MTA) in New York
Katie Walder (born 1982), American actress
Marc Walder (born 1965), Swiss journalist, former professional tennis player
Pius Walder (1952–1982), Austrian lumberjack and poacher
Russel Walder (born 1959), American jazz oboist
Samuel Walder (1879–1946), Australian politician and businessman

Given name:
Walder Frey, a fictional character in George R.R. Martin's A Song of Ice and Fire
Charles Walder Grinstead (1860–1930), English champion tennis player
John Walder Dunlop Holder (born 1949), Barbadian Anglican archbishop

See also
Wald (disambiguation)
Waldberg (disambiguation)
Walter (disambiguation)
Wilder (disambiguation)